Pareiorhina hyptiorhachis is a species of catfish in the family Loricariidae. It is native to South America, where it occurs in the basins of the Pomba River and the Paraíba do Sul in Brazil. It is typically found in small streams with moderate to fast flow, margins covered in aquatic vegetation, and a substrate composed of rocks and sand. It is known to occur alongside the species Geophagus brasiliensis and Neoplecostomus microps, as well as members of the genera Astyanax, Characidium, Harttia, Imparfinis, and Trichomycterus. The species reaches 3.9 cm (1.5 inches) in standard length.

References 

Loricariidae